Hilarographa youngiella is a species of moth of the family Tortricidae. It is found in North America, including Washington and Vancouver Island.

The forewings are brown with many fine white lines and prominent black spots at the anal angle. The hindwings are brown.

References

Moths described in 1922
Hilarographini